Hordley is a civil parish in Shropshire, England.  It contains eight listed buildings that are recorded in the National Heritage List for England.  Of these, one is at Grade II*, the middle of the three grades, and the others are at Grade II, the lowest grade.  The parish contains the village of Hordley, and all the listed buildings are in or near the village.  Most of the listed buildings are memorials in the churchyard of St Mary's Church, which is also listed.  The other two listed buildings are houses.


Key

Buildings

References

Citations

Sources

Lists of buildings and structures in Shropshire